Elizabeth Safrit Bull (born May 27, 1992) is an American model and beauty pageant titleholder who was crowned Miss United States 2014 and represented the United States at Miss World. Safrit placed 2nd-runner-up at Miss World 2014. Safrit holds a degree in political science from the University of South Carolina. In 2017, Safrit took partial ownership of the United States franchise for the Miss World competition.

References 

1992 births
Living people
American beauty pageant winners

Beauty pageant contestants